The 1960 Limerick Senior Hurling Championship was the 66th staging of the Limerick Senior Hurling Championship since its establishment by the Limerick County Board.

Cappamore were the defending champions.

On 11 September 1960, Kilmallock won the championship after a 4–05 to 0–04 defeat of Claughaun in the final. It was their first ever championship title.

Results

Final

References

Limerick Senior Hurling Championship
Limerick Senior Hurling Championship